The City of Ferndale was designated as a State Historic Landmark (No. 883) in 1975 by the California State Parks Office of Historic Preservation. Ferndale's Main Street Historic District was established in 1994 by the National Park Service and placed on the National Register of Historic Places.

Architecture
Two distinct architectural phases are represented: late 19th century Victorian architecture, 1880 to 1890 and the early Modern period of the 20th century, 1920 to 1936. Eastlake-Stick style buildings by Architect T.J. Frost are particularly well represented as are Italianate, Queen Anne, Neo-Classic, Bungalow, and Mission styles.

The Ferndale Main Street Historic District covers 46 acres, includes 39 contributing buildings and one object, the Town Clock.

Six other Historic Landmarks, the Shaw House, the Berding House, the Catholic Church of the Assumption Rectory, Ferndale Public Library and the
Alford-Nielson House are within the city limits, and the Fern Cottage Historic District and F. W. Andreasen–John Rossen House are slightly out of town.

Popular culture

Legoland Model Replica
Many of Ferndale's buildings have been recreated at the Legoland California theme park -  the only American small town represented alongside New York, San Francisco, Las Vegas and other nationally known locations.  Ferndale was settled by many Danes, and Lego is a Danish company.  In 1995, Legoland staff took hundreds of photos in Ferndale, and used over 1 million Lego bricks to recreate the town in the Miniland section of the park.

Films and Movies
Ferndale's historic Main Street has been shown in television and movies since the 1960s.  The street is featured in movies like The Majestic, Outbreak, Salem's Lot and A Death in Canaan.

References

External links
 
 

Historic districts on the National Register of Historic Places in California
California Historical Landmarks
History of Humboldt County, California
Tourist attractions in Humboldt County, California
Ferndale, California
National Register of Historic Places in Humboldt County, California